The Masjed Soleyman Dam (also known as Godar-e Landar Dam) is a dam in Iran on the Karun river. The dam is a rock-fill structure with a vertical clay-core. The dam was built by Iran Water and Power Resources Development Co. and completed by 2002. The power station was built in two 1000 MW stages. The first stage was complete in 2003 and the second in September 2007. The spillway gates are believed to be the largest of their kind in the world.

See also 

 List of reservoirs and dams in Iran

External links

References 

Hydroelectric power stations in Iran
Dams in Khuzestan Province
Rock-filled dams
Dams completed in 2002
Dams on the Karun River
2002 establishments in Iran